Michael Erik Kurilla (born May 16, 1966) is a United States Army general who serves as the 15th commander of United States Central Command since April 1, 2022. He previously served as the commanding general of the XVIII Airborne Corps and before that as the chief of staff of the United States Central Command.

Biography

Born in California and raised in Elk River, Minnesota, Kurilla received a bachelor’s degree in aerospace engineering from the United States Military Academy, an MBA from Regis University, and a masters degree in national security studies from the National War College. After graduating from West Point, he was commissioned into the U.S. Army as an infantry officer in 1988. During his early career Kurilla participated in the United States invasion of Panama  and the Gulf War, as well as operations in Haiti, Kosovo, and Bosnia.

From 2004 to 2014, he was stationed in the geographic area of responsibility of the U.S. Central Command, deploying to Iraq, Afghanistan, and Syria. In 2005, he deployed to Iraq as the commander of 1st Battalion, 24th Infantry Regiment, 1st Brigade, 25th Infantry Division. He was awarded a Bronze Star with "V" device after a battle in Mosul in which he "was shot three times but continued to fire back at insurgents while directing his troops." He is a former commander of the 75th Ranger Regiment. From 2012 to 2014 he was the Assistant Commanding General of Joint Special Operations Command. He served as commander of the 82nd Airborne Division from 2016–2018 and Chief of Staff of U.S. Central Command from 2018–2019. He assumed command of the XVIII Airborne Corps in October 2019. In 2022, he deployed to Germany to oversee U.S. troop deployments in response to the 2021–2022 Russo-Ukrainian crisis.

Awards and decorations

References

|-

|-

|-

|-

|-

|-

|-

Living people
Place of birth missing (living people)
Recipients of the Defense Superior Service Medal
Recipients of the Distinguished Service Medal (US Army)
Recipients of the Legion of Merit
United States Army generals
United States Army personnel of the Gulf War
United States Army personnel of the Iraq War
United States Army personnel of the War in Afghanistan (2001–2021)
1966 births